Matthew Henry Halton (September 7, 1904 – December 3, 1956) was a Canadian television journalist, most famous as a foreign correspondent for the Canadian Broadcasting Corporation during World War II.

Biography 
Born in Pincher Creek, Alberta, Halton attended teachers college in Calgary and taught school for several years before attending the University of Alberta, where he gained experience reporting and editing for The Gateway. He subsequently went to London, England to study at King's College London and at the London School of Economics, writing extensively on European affairs for Canadian newspapers. He briefly returned to Canada in 1931, but then returned to Europe as a correspondent for the Toronto Star. He covered such issues as the rise of Nazism in Germany, the Spanish Civil War and the Winter War; with the Munich Crisis of 1938, he began filing reports for CBC Radio as well.

Halton was briefly reassigned to the Star's Washington, DC bureau in 1940, but was soon sent back to cover the North African campaign. He reported extensively for the CBC over the next two years, and then briefly returned to Canada to write and publish the memoir Ten Years to Alamein. In 1943, he was named the CBC's senior war correspondent, returning to London and covering all aspects of the final two years of the war. After the end of World War II, he remained in Europe as the network's senior foreign correspondent, covering the Nuremberg Trials, the funeral of King George VI, the coronation of Queen Elizabeth II and the 1954 Geneva Conference, among other stories. He also filed frequent reports for the BBC as well.

In 1956, Halton received an honorary doctorate from the University of Alberta. He died several months later, following stomach surgery.

Halton's son David later became CBC Television's chief political correspondent. His daughter Kathleen married influential British theatre critic Kenneth Tynan, and later established her own career as a writer.

Matthew Halton High School in Halton's home town of Pincher Creek, Alberta is named after him.

Archives
The Matthew Halton fonds is held by Library and Archives Canada, under archival reference number R10120. The fonds consists of 2.25 metres of textual records, 174 photographs, 15 audio cassettes, and 2 maps. The description includes a finding aid.

References

External links
 Matthew Halton biography at the Canadian Communications Foundation
 Matthew Halton profile at CBC archives
 Matthew Halton fonds (R10120) at Library and Archives Canada

1904 births
1956 deaths
Canadian radio reporters and correspondents
Canadian Broadcasting Corporation people
People from the Municipal District of Pincher Creek No. 9
Alumni of King's College London
Alumni of the London School of Economics
Canadian war correspondents